Midway, Mississippi may refer to the following places in the U.S. state of Mississippi:

Midway, Copiah County, Mississippi, an unincorporated community
Midway, Hinds County, Mississippi, an unincorporated community
Midway, Leake County, Mississippi, an unincorporated community
Midway, Scott County, Mississippi, an unincorporated community
Midway, Tallahatchie County, Mississippi, a ghost town
Midway, Tishomingo County, Mississippi, an unincorporated community
Midway, Yazoo County, Mississippi, an unincorporated community